David Alan Wolkins (born June 2, 1943) is a Republican member of the Indiana House of Representatives, representing the 18th District since 1988. He has consistently supported legislation that would raise Indiana's speed limit.  Wolkins is a member of the American Legislative Exchange Council (ALEC), serving as Indiana State Chair.

References

External links
Representative David Wolkins official Indiana State Legislature site
 

1943 births
Living people
Republican Party members of the Indiana House of Representatives
21st-century American politicians